The WTA Tour is the elite tour for professional women's tennis organised by the Women's Tennis Association (WTA). The WTA Tour includes the four Grand Slam tournaments, the WTA Tour Championships and the WTA Tier I, Tier II, Tier III, Tier IV and Tier V events. ITF tournaments are not part of the WTA Tour, although they award points for the WTA World Ranking.

Season summary

Singles 
The year-end number one in 2000 and thus the No. 1 player as 2001 begun, Martina Hingis started the new season off well by winning the title at the Adidas International over nemesis Lindsay Davenport. The two looked like they might meet again in the Australian Open final: Hingis beat Venus Williams in her semifinal, but Davenport was then surprised by a resurgent Jennifer Capriati, who was enjoying a dream run to her first Grand Slam final. Going against the odds, Capriati also scalped Hingis to win her first ever Slam title and re-entered the top 10 in the rankings after a near-eight year absence, a record gap.

Despite neither claiming the Australian Open, Hingis and Davenport continued to dominate proceedings for the rest of January and February. The two met again at the Toray Pan Pacific Open, with Davenport triumphing this time to win the title. Hingis won the inaugural events in the Middle East, the Qatar Total FinaElf Open and the Dubai Duty Free Women's Open, while Davenport was also victorious at the State Farm Classic. Meanwhile, Amélie Mauresmo claimed both titles in her home country of France, winning at the Open Gaz de France and the Internationaux de Tennis Feminin Nice; and Monica Seles provided a notable victory over in-form Capriati in the IGA US Indoors final.

The Pacific Life Open saw an all-teen battle commence in its championship match, with 19-year-old Serena Williams reclaiming the title she first won in 1999 by beating 17-year-old Kim Clijsters in the final. Serena's older sister, Venus, responded by winning March's other big title, the Ericsson Open, surviving a nail-biter against Australian Open champion Capriati.

As the clay court season begun in April, Mauresmo continued to enjoy a strong run of form to win her third straight title on the green clay courts of the Bausch & Lomb Championships. Her 16-match win streak, however, was stopped by Hingis in the quarterfinals of the Family Circle Cup—a tournament that saw Capriati win her first Tier I title since the Canadian Open in 1991, defeating Hingis in three sets.

Moving on to the red clay courts, Venus Williams showed devastating form at the Betty Barclay Cup, losing just 12 games en route to the title. Mauresmo once again posted impressive results, taking down Hingis and Capriati to win the Eurocard German Open, and making the final at the Italian Open—only being stopped by Yugoslav teenager Jelena Dokić who was enjoying a career best week to win her first ever singles title.

The French Open provided shocks from early on, with clay court standouts and favourites Mauresmo and Venus Williams both crashing out in the first round. The two upsets blew the bottom half of the draw wide open, allowing Kim Clijsters to reach her first major final, knocking out compatriot Justine Henin in the first all-Belgian semifinal in Grand Slam history. Over on the top half, things went more to plan, with Capriati and Hingis setting up a rematch of that year's Australian Open final. Capriati eased through that, but the final proved to be the bigger challenge. After being two points from defeat on numerous occasions, she eventually triumphed over Clijsters in a 12–10 third set to continue her faultless 14–0 record in Grand Slam play that year.

Wimbledon also opened with an upset: World No. 1 Hingis crashed out in straight sets against Virginia Ruano Pascual, repeating her first round exit of 1999. Lindsay Davenport had returned to action on the grass after missing the entire clay season due to a right knee bone bruise, and instantly established herself as a threat with a title run at the Britannic Asset Championships. She easily advanced to the semifinals, before losing in a rematch of the 2000 final to Venus Williams. On the other side of the draw, Henin snapped Capriati's Grand Slam win streak to become the second straight Belgian player to compete in a major final. However, like Clijsters before her, she went down to the favourite, Williams, who became only the fourth woman in the Open era to win consecutive Wimbledon titles whilst winning her third Grand Slam overall.

Americans players dominated their home turf during the summer hard court swing, with Venus Williams proving to be the standout player for the second straight year. Despite losing to Meghann Shaughnessy at the Bank of the West Classic, she won two events: the Acura Classic and Pilot Pen Tennis, allowing her to head into her US Open title defence on a 9-match winning streak. Davenport also stamped herself as a major contender with a 13–3 win–loss record during the American hard court tournaments, including a title at the estyle.com Classic. Meanwhile, Serena Williams won the other big US Open warm-up tournament, the Rogers AT&T Cup.

That year's US Open provided the first ever all-Williams final between sisters Venus and Serena, after both upset the world's top two players in their respective semifinals, Hingis and Capriati. In a historic final that was the first woman's final to be played in prime time, Venus beat her little sister to defend her title and repeat the Wimbledon-US Open double she also did the previous year. It was the first all-sister final at a Grand Slam event since the 1884 Wimbledon Championships, between the Watson sisters, Maud and Lilian.

Davenport proved to be the standout player during the indoor season, winning three tournaments in consecutive weeks: the Porsche Tennis Grand Prix, the Swisscom Challenge and the Generali Ladies Linz, repeating the achievement she also did in 1998. Also performing well were Dokić, who won two titles at the AIG Japan Open and the Kremlin Cup, just two results that capped off her breakthrough season with a rise into the top 10 in the world; and Seles, who finished her season with a 13-match winning streak. Meanwhile, World No. 579 Angelique Widjaja became the lowest-ranked player ever to win a Tour title at the place of her home tournament, the Wismilak International. Off-court, tour stalwarts Nathalie Tauziat and Anke Huber both announced their retirements from singles play.

Elsewhere, Capriati ascended to the No. 1 ranking for the first time in her career on October 15 after an injury caused Hingis to be unable to defend her points from the previous year. Hingis, who had held the No. 1 ranking for the entire season to that point, was also forced to withdraw from the Sanex Championships.

That year's Sanex Championships was also missing Venus Williams, who had to withdraw with a wrist injury. In her absence, sister Serena won the title despite not playing since her U.S. Open final loss to Venus, becoming the first player to win the year-ending championship in their debut appearance. Davenport made the final, but had to default to Williams due to a bone bruise. Nevertheless, with Capriati's quarterfinal loss to Sandrine Testud, Davenport's final appearance was enough for her to gain the No. 1 ranking by just 10 points, her second time in the year-end No. 1 position following 1998.

Schedule 
The table below shows the 2001 WTA Tour schedule.

Key

January

February

March

April

May

June

July

August

September

October

November

Statistics 
List of players and titles won, last name alphabetically:
  Lindsay Davenport – Tokyo Pan Pacific, Scottsdale, Eastbourne, Manhattan Beach, Filderstadt, Zurich and Linz (7)
  Venus Williams – Miami, Hamburg, Wimbledon, San Diego, New Haven and U.S. Open (6)
  Amélie Mauresmo – Paris, Nice, Amelia Island and Berlin (4)
  Monica Seles – Oklahoma City, Bahia, Tokyo Japan Open and Shanghai (4)
  Jennifer Capriati – Australian Open, Charleston and French Open (3)
  Kim Clijsters – Stanford, Leipzig and Luxembourg (3)
  Jelena Dokić – Rome, Tokyo Princess Cup and Moscow (3)
  Justine Henin – Gold Coast, Canberra and 's-Hertogenbosch (3)
  Martina Hingis – Sydney, Doha and Dubai (3)
  Serena Williams – Indian Wells, Toronto and Munich Championships (3)
  Rita Grande – Hobart and Bratislava (2)
  Ángeles Montolio – Estoril and Bol (2)
  Iroda Tulyaganova – Vienna and Knokke-Heist (2)
  Arantxa Sánchez Vicario – Porto and Madrid (2)
  Amanda Coetzer – Acapulco (1)
  Silvia Farina Elia – Strasbourg (1)
  Adriana Gerši – Basel (1)
  Zsófia Gubacsi – Casablanca (1)
  Bianka Lamade – Tashkent (1)
  Magdalena Maleeva – Budapest (1)
  Anabel Medina Garrigues – Palermo (1)
  Barbara Rittner – Antwerp (1)
  Patty Schnyder – Pattaya (1)
  Meghann Shaughnessy – Quebec City (1)
  Paola Suárez – Bogotá (1)
  Nathalie Tauziat – Birmingham (1)
  Sandrine Testud – Waikoloa (1)
  Cristina Torrens Valero – Sopot (1)
  Meilen Tu – Auckland (1)
  Angelique Widjaja – Bali (1)

The following players won their first title:
  Meilen Tu – Auckland
  Rita Grande – Hobart
  Ángeles Montolio – Estoril
  Jelena Dokić – Rome
  Silvia Farina Elia – Strasbourg
  Bianka Lamade – Tashkent
  Anabel Medina Garrigues – Palermo
  Zsófia Gubacsi – Casablanca
  Adriana Gerši – Basel
  Angelique Widjaja – Bali

Titles won by nation:
  – 25 (Auckland, Australian Open, Tokyo Pan Pacific, Oklahoma City, Scottsdale, Indian Wells, Miami, Charleston, Hamburg, French Open, Eastbourne, Wimbledon, San Diego, Manhattan Beach, Toronto, New Haven, U.S. Open, Bahia, Quebec City, Tokyo Japan Open, Filderstadt, Shanghai, Zurich, Linz and Munich Championships)
  – 6 (Gold Coast, Canberra, 's-Hertogenbosch, Stanford, Leipzig and Luxembourg)
  – 6 (Paris, Nice, Amelia Island, Berlin, Birmingham and Waikoloa)
  – 6 (Porto, Estoril, Bol, Madrid, Palermo and Sopot)
  – 4 (Sydney, Doha, Dubai and Pattaya)
  – 3 (Hobart, Strasbourg and Bratislava)
  – 3 (Rome, Tokyo Princess Cup and Moscow)
  – 2 (Antwerp and Tashkent)
  – 2 (Vienna and Knokke-Heist)
  – 1 (Bogotá)
  – 1 (Budapest)
  – 1 (Basel)
  – 1 (Casablanca)
  – 1 (Indonesia)
  – 1 (Acapulco)

Rankings 
Below are the 2001 WTA year-end rankings in both singles and doubles competition:

See also 
 2001 ATP Tour
 WTA Tour
 List of female tennis players
 List of tennis tournaments

References

External links 
 Women's Tennis Association (WTA) official website

 
WTA Tour
WTA Tour seasons